William Beauchamp Wildman (1852-1922) was a British teacher and historian. He taught at Westminster School, Sherborne School, and was Headmaster at Abbey House from 1893 until 1908.

Early life and family
William Beauchamp Wildman was born on the 11 January 1852 at Old Meldrum, Aberdeenshire, son of the Rev. Thomas Wildman, domestic chaplain to the Earl of Galloway at Garlieston and later incumbent of St Andrew’s, Callander, and Sarah Anne Bates of Kirriemuir.

William had five siblings: Marion (1848-1900), Agnes Sophia (1850-1932), Mary Rachel Whitworth (1854-1911), Elizabeth Annie (1855-1931), and John Bates (1859-1929).  Marion married Ernest Temperley (1849-1889) and they had a daughter Marion and three sons, Ernest Walter Pyemont Temperley (1875-1926), Arthur Cecil Temperley (1877-1940), and Harold William Vazeille Temperley (1879-1939) who all attended Sherborne School.  Agnes married Duncan Cameron Fraser at Sitapur, Bengal.  Mary died at sea in 1911 when returning from Cape Town to England on the Walmar Castle.  Elizabeth was appointed Lady Superintendent of Queen Alexandra’s Military Nursing Service for India on 25 November 1890, a post she retired from on 24 November 1913.  On the 21 July 1908 she was invested by the King at Buckingham Palace with the Royal Red Cross (First Class) medal ‘in recognition of her special devotion and competency in connection with her nursing duties in India’, and on  12 December 1911 she was awarded the Kaisar-i-Hind medal (2nd class) for public service in India.  John Bates Wildman (1859-1929) was Assistant master at Lockers Park School, Hemel Hempstead, Hertfordshire.

From 1864 to 1870, William attended Glenalmond College where he became Captain of the School and was awarded the Buccleugh Scholarship for Classics and the Trower Medal for Mathematics.  In 1870 he went up to Lincoln College, Oxford, and from 1871 to 1876 was Junior Student at Christ Church, Oxford.  (BA 1875, MA 1881).

Career
From 1875 to 1877, William taught at Westminster School, and in May 1877 he was appointed by Headmaster H.D. Harper as an assistant master at Sherborne School where, after a brief period as Sixth Form Tutor, he took over the teaching of the Classical Upper Fifth.

In May 1883, William opened a school boarding house in Newland, Sherborne with five boarders (Herbert Graystone, James Kelway, Percy John Paterson, Frank Sydney Paterson and Edgar Wood), however, in 1884 the School Governors granted him permission to build a new boarding house in Westbury, Sherborne on land known as ‘Troy Town Close’ owned by the Digby Estate.  In Easter 1885, William transferred his borders from Newland to his new boarding house which he named ‘Mapperty’.  A libel action brought against Headmaster E.M. Young in November 1889 by a former master resulted in a rapid decline in the number of boys attending the School with the result that in February 1890 the Headmaster wrote to the School Governors that ‘Mr Wildman, one of the most valuable of our Masters, in despair of filling the House he has recently built, is standing for a headmastership, and with his departure our new Cadet Corps must, I fear, collapse’.  The Headmaster added that the number of boarders at ‘Mapperty’ at that time was sixteen with two absent.  During the Christmas holidays in 1890, William surrendered the lease of ‘Mapperty’ to the Religious Order of Christian Instruction from Ghent.  The property passed out of the School’s control at Easter 1891.  William, however, remained at Sherborne.

Amongst William’s boarders at ‘Mapperty’ were the author John Cowper Powys (1872-1963) and his brother Littleton Charles Powys (1874-1955), who both joined the house in September 1886.  John Cowper Powys described William in his Autobiography (1934):

‘Mr Wildman was indeed a remarkable character.  He was a bachelor in those days and the inexhaustible and wayward high spirits of his pantagruelian soul had not yet been tempered by responsibility.  What a Latinist and Hellenist he was; and what a rare eccentric!  His real interests were all intellectual.  He was a first rate form-master, but I think he never “cottoned,” as the say is, to being responsible for a houseful of turbulent boys.  Not one of us knew how to take him.  In many ways, like a true scholar, he was as simple-minded as a child; and then again he would make it quite clear even to the most unfledged intelligence that he was, in regard to religious and moral tradition, emancipated to a degree that bewildered and disturbed.  Nor could you ever know how he would behave!  When angry he fell into a blind fury; but not into a schoolmaster’s fury; into a child’s fury.  Indeed, considering the really powerful intelligence it put to rout, it was a pathetic fury!  I always admired and liked Mr Wildman; though I never understood him.  Few did, I fancy; whether among the boys or the masters.  His chief friend and crony was our deaf music-master, Mr Louis N. Parker, who, with his famous Sherborne Pageant actually inaugurated that form of historic panorama, and who subsequently became a considerable playwright.  No, you never could predict how Mr Wildman would react to any mortal event.  This unpredictableness endeared him to all except the stupid and dull; but it was a disconcerting trait in a schoolmaster.’

In September 1888, William formed the Sherborne School Cadet Corps, attached to the 1st Volunteer Battalion Dorset Regiment. Captain W.B. Wildman was the first Commanding Officer with Lieutenant Charles Selby Whitehead (1852-1934) and 2nd Lieutenant Thomas Cooper Rogerson (1870-1941) as his subalterns.  The Corps wore the scarlet uniform of the Regiment with helmets and white leather belts.  In 1889, Sherborne was one of the four Schools represented in the first Public Schools Provisional Battalion at Churn Camp.  William commanded the Corps for 22 years with ‘enthusiasm and efficiency’.  He retired as Honorary Captain in May 1910 leaving the Corps ‘efficient and prosperous’.  The majority of Old Shirburnians who served in the First World War must have received from him their first instruction in the art of warfare.

In 1893, William took over as housemaster of Abbey House which he held until July 1908.  He also served as School Bursar from 1907 to 1919, President of the Sherborne School Archaeological Society, and as School Librarian, donating a number of books to the School Library, including:

 Joseph Hall, The Works of Joseph Hall, Bishop of Exeter (Miles Flesher, London, 1628), 2 vols. Given in memory of his son A.H. Wildman.
 William Wilkins, Report on the State of Repair of Sherborne Church (Sherborne, 1828). Given in memory of his son A.H. Wildman.
 Ottavio Antonio Baiardi, Le pitture antiche d’Ercolano e contorni incise con qualche spiegazione (Naples, 1757). Purchased for the school library from the library of Drax of Holnest.
 William Robertson, Thesaurus, Græcæ Linguæ (Cambridge, Johannes Hayes, 1676).
 Henry Hammond, A Practical Catechism ([London, 1684]). ‘Ex Libris Thomas Wildman STP’.
 John Henry Newman, John Keble, William Palmer, & others, Tracts for the times, by members of the University of Oxford (Vol. II) for 1834-5 (London, 1839). Inscribed: ‘Ex Libris Thomas Wildman STP’.
 John Pearson, An Exposition of the Creed (London, 1692). ‘Ex Libris Thomae Wildman, STP’. Stuck into the back of the volume are two scores by Lady Emma Tollemarch, sung at All Souls Church, Halifax.
 Paolo Sarpi, The Historie of the Councell of Trent (London, 1620). ‘Ex Libris Thomae Wildman STP’.
 Taylor’s Polemic Discour (London, 1657). ‘Ex Libris Thomae Wildman STP’.

After leaving Abbey House in July 1908, William and his family lived until his retirement in 1919 at Graystone House in Newland, Sherborne.

Retirement
On the 28 July 1919, a ceremony was held in William’s old Form VA classroom, at which the Rev. Arthur Field (who had been head of William’s house ‘Mapperty’ in Westbury) on behalf of Old Shirburnian Society presented William with a silver cigar box and a cheque for £275.  The Upper Fifth Form presented William with a silver spoon, and, on behalf of the School in general, he was given several handsome books.

On the 1st August 1919, William and Winifred Wildman moved to La Palmas, 30 Hawkwood Road, Boscombe.

In 1921, the former Sun Inn was renamed ‘Bow House’ at the suggestion of William in remembrance of the adjoining ‘Bow’ or archway that marked the boundary of the Abbey precincts.

Personal life
On the 30 December 1886 at St John’s Episcopal Church, Edinburgh, William was married to Winifred Mabel Spens Black (1865-1948), daughter of the late James Spens Black of Craigmaddie, Stirlingshire and Mary Jane Hattersley Sands (1827-1913).  Winifred’s brother, Arthur Henry Spens Black (1857-1888), had been a music master at Glenalmond College where William was a pupil.  The wedding was attended by fellow Sherborne schoolmaster, H.R. King, who wrote in his diary ‘Wedding went off satisfactorily.  Pleasant dinner party evening.  The new Mrs W will find Sherborne society rather slow.’'

William and Winifred had two sons: Thomas Beauchamp Wildman (1888-1965) attended Sherborne School 1902-1907, and afterwards joined the Consular Service, serving as HM Consul-General at Galatz, Deputy Commissioner on European Commission of the Danube, HM Chargé d’Affaires at Bogota, and HM Consul at Santander, Spain; Arthur Henry Wildman (1890-1915) attended Sherborne School 1903-1907, and in 1910 joined the Indian Army, becoming a Lieutenant in the 130th Baluchis. Arthur was killed on active service at Maktau, East Africa on the 14 September 1915.

Death and legacy
William Beauchamp Wildman died at 7 Park Road, Bournemouth on 15 August 1922, aged 70.  Winifred died on 2 January 1948 at the Grove House Nursing Home in Ludwell, Wiltshire.

At Sherborne School, the Wildman Latin Prose Prize for the Fifth Form was founded in 1925 by his friends in his memory, and in September 1930 the Wildman Society, a debating society, was named in his memory.  William is also remembered on a memorial pew in Sherborne School chapel.

Writings
Books written by William Beauchamp Wildman:A Catalogue of the Library of Sherborne School (Sherborne, J.C. & A.T. Sawtell, 1894)A Short History of Sherborne from 705 A.D. (Sherborne, F. Bennett, 1896)King Alfred’s Boyhood, and the Date of His Death (Sherborne, F. Bennett, 1898)Life of S. Aldhelm. First Bishop of Sherborne (London, Chapman & Hall Ltd.; Sherborne, F. Bennett, 1905)Sherborne School: some account of its buildings (Sherborne, F. Bennett, 1908)A Guide to the Neighbourhood of Sherborne and Yeovil'', edited by Henry Castree Hughes under the supervision of W.B. Wildman (Sherborne School Archaeological Society, 1911)

References

1852 births
1922 deaths
20th-century English educators
20th-century English historians
Dorset Regiment officers